The 2005 Cup of Russia was the fifth event of six in the 2005–06 ISU Grand Prix of Figure Skating, a senior-level international invitational competition series. It was held at the Ice Palace in Saint Petersburg on November 24–27. Medals were awarded in the disciplines of men's singles, ladies' singles, pair skating, and ice dancing. Skaters earned points toward qualifying for the 2005–06 Grand Prix Final. The compulsory dance was the Yankee Polka.

Results

Men

Ladies

Pairs

Ice dancing

References

External links
 2005 Cup of Russia
 PLUSHENKO SHINES IN CUP OF RUSSIA
 PLUSHENKO WINS GRAND PRIX

Cup Of Russia, 2005
Cup of Russia
Rostelecom Cup